Mark James Gosche (born 2 December 1955) is a New Zealand politician. He is a member of the Labour Party. He was born in Auckland to Samoan parents, and has been active in New Zealand's Pacific Islander community.

Biography

Early life and career
Gosche was born in 1955 to German-Samoan parents. He was raised and educated in South Auckland. He was a full-time official with the Hotel, Hospital & Restaurant Workers Union later the Service & Food Workers Union − or SFWU) for 15 years. He was later a union secretary with the SFWU for 7 years. This led him to join the Labour Party in 1981.

Gosche founded the Union Health Centres (four low cost medical centres for union members, doctors and nurses) and was the original director of the organisation. He was a trustee of the Union Law Centre and a member of the national executive of the New Zealand Council of Trade Unions (NZCTU). He was also on several boards including the Trade Union Authority and New Zealand Tourism Council.

Member of Parliament

He was first elected to Parliament as a list MP in the 1996 election, and was seen as a key bridge builder between Labour and the Alliance. He was later MP for the Auckland seat of Maungakiekie following the 1999 election. He held a number of Cabinet posts, including Minister of Corrections, Minister of Housing, Minister of Transport, and Minister of Pacific Island Affairs. In May 2003, however, he resigned all his ministerial roles due to the serious illness of his wife, who had suffered a brain haemorrhage.

At the 2008 election, Gosche retired from politics to spend more time with his family.

Post-parliamentary career
In 2009 he was nominated as a director on the New Zealand Rugby League board, being confirmed on 27 June.  On 31 May 2011 Gosche was elected the Chairman of the Asia Pacific Rugby League Confederation. Gosche's term on the NZRL board ended in 2012 after he decided not reapply for the position.

Gosche is the Chief Executive of Vaka Tautua, a role he took up in July 2014 after five years on the governance board. Vaka Tautua is a not-for-profit ‘for Pacific by Pacific’ community health and social service provider working in the areas of disability, mental health, older people, family violence and financial capability – with offices in Auckland, Wellington and Christchurch. The governance board and staff of Vaka Tautua are almost all of Pacific Island heritage and all operational staff are bilingual.
 
Since leaving politics he has held a large number of governance roles including being Chief Advisor Strategic Relationships at the Ministry of Pacific Island Affairs in Auckland, TYLA Trust, COMET Auckland, Vaka Tautua, Brain Injury Association, Talklink Trust and Fonua Ola. He currently serves on the board of Lifewise and was recently elected to the Mt. Wellington Licensing Trust which owns and operates hotel and conference centres – the profits of which are returned to the community via a charitable trust. Gosche's experience is also informed by his wife Carol whom he is a caregiver for. Carol, had a severe brain haemorrhage in 2002. He and his wife had four children.

Gosche is currently employed by the Manukau Institute of Technology as External Relations Manager for MIT's Pasifika Development office.

At the 2016 Auckland elections, Gosche was elected to the Mt Wellington Licensing Trust. In April 2018 Gosche was appointed chair of the Counties Manukau District Health Board, effective 3 May 2018.

In June 2018 Housing and Urban Development Minister Phil Twyford announced Gosche as deputy chair of the Housing New Zealand board.

Honours
In April 2007 he was bestowed with the Samoan matai title Vui at his grandmother's village of Lano in Samoa.

Notes

References

1955 births
Living people
New Zealand Labour Party MPs
Members of the Cabinet of New Zealand
Ministers of Housing (New Zealand)
New Zealand people of Samoan descent
New Zealand people of German descent
Samoan chiefs
New Zealand rugby league administrators
New Zealand list MPs
New Zealand Rugby League board members
Members of the New Zealand House of Representatives
New Zealand MPs for Auckland electorates
21st-century New Zealand politicians
Members of district health boards in New Zealand